Laurent Morin (14 February 1908, in Montreal – 31 December 1996) was a Canadian Roman Catholic bishop. He was ordained a priest for the Archdiocese of Montreal on 27 May 1934 and was appointed to the post of titular bishop of Arsamosata and auxiliary bishop of Montreal on 8 September 1955. His consecration was on October 30 with chief consecrator Paul-Émile Léger, assisted by Joseph-Conrad Chaumont and Lawrence Patrick Whelan.

Morin became bishop of the Diocese of Prince Albert from 28 February 1959 until he retired on 9 April 1983. He participated in the Second Vatican Council.

References

20th-century Roman Catholic bishops in Canada
Clergy from Montreal
1908 births
1996 deaths
Roman Catholic bishops of Prince Albert